Chloe Rayner (born 18 September 1996) is an Australian judoka. She won a bronze medal at the 2014 Commonwealth Games in the women's 48 kg division. She competed at the 2016 Summer Olympics in the women's 48 kg event, in which she was eliminated in the first round by Laëtitia Payet.

References

External links
 

1996 births
Living people
Sportspeople from Basildon
Australian female judoka
Commonwealth Games bronze medallists for Australia
Judoka at the 2014 Commonwealth Games
English emigrants to Australia
Judoka at the 2016 Summer Olympics
Olympic judoka of Australia
Commonwealth Games medallists in judo
21st-century Australian women
Medallists at the 2014 Commonwealth Games